Sthalam is a 2011 Malayalam film written and directed by Kaviyoor Sivaprasad, and produced by Mariam Anoop and Rajesh S Nair under the banner of Avagama creations.  The film, starring Bala, Shweta Menon, Sudheesh, and Jyothirmayi, and shot in Tiruvalla, is based on the life of environmentalist Pokkudan.  Second schedule for Sthalam started at Kannur in India by 26 October 2011. Jyothiramayi plays a deglam role in the film.

Cast
 Bala
 Shweta Menon
 Sudheesh
 Jyothirmayi
 Risabawa
 Kundara Johny
 Kochu Preman
 Kallen Pokkudan

References

2011 films
2010s Malayalam-language films
Films shot in Kerala
Films shot in Kannur
Films directed by Kaviyoor Sivaprasad